The University of Oriente Venezuela (UDO) is one of the most important universities of Venezuela, located in Eastern Venezuela.

The university has five campuses that are located in the states of Sucre, Anzoátegui, Monagas, Bolívar, and Nueva Esparta.

There is a very large campus in Barcelona which neighbors the city of Puerto La Cruz, one of Venezuela's most beautiful tourist attractions.

Since May 1, 2019, the rectory of the university at Sucre has been under siege by Chavistas demanding the resignation of the rector, Milena Bravo, and the university management. Students at the university as represented by Darwin Rangel wish to retake the rectory peacefully, and are supported by representatives at other Venezuelan universities, with figures like Rafaela Requesens visiting the campus. The occupation of the rectory led to civil protests at universities and schools in order to demand better treatment and freedoms.

History 
The Universidad de Oriente was founded on 21 November 1958 by Decree Law No. 459 published in the Official Gazette of the Republic of Venezuela No. 25,831 by the Governing Board chaired by Dr. Edgar Sanabria, as Minister of Education on Dr. Rafael Pizani, under the leadership of its founder Rector Dr. Luis Manuel Peñalver. It became operational on 12 February 1959, which marked the birth of the University of the East and a year later, 113 students and a dozen teachers, in an old mansion of Cumana Caiguire sector, leading the way of fruitful academic activity in this house college.

On 29 March 1960, the republic's president, Rómulo Betancourt, officially opening the Universidad de Oriente, an act on the former site of the School "Pedro Arnal" in the capital sucrense. In his notes: "This university will allow the training of professionals in the various branches of human knowledge, to study here and here to stay ... those students at the University of East must come from all social classes, because in this country must make certain that the formula in the only democracy that exists is the aristocracy of persistent efforts, hard working and creative "

Following the lack of infrastructure and lack of trained personnel in the region to impart knowledge is entered into an agreement with the University of Kansas City and some other universities in South America and Japan to educate the teachers. The need for construction of the campus led to the state of Sucre State Council to offer a plot of 300 hectares in Cerro Colorado to the development of the Rectory and School of Basic Courses. In October 1961, Nucleus is installed in Monagas with the School of Agricultural Engineering and Petroleum, at the Center for Bolivar began in January 1962 with the School of Medicine and School of Geology and Mines, in the Nucleus of Anzoátegui (initially Instituto Tecnologico named Barcelona) began on 9 January 1963 with the School of Chemical Engineering at the Core of Nueva Esparta basic courses were initiated on January 21, 1969, all these lands were donated large transnational companies and rulers states.

In planning the University of East is defined as a higher education system serving the region with common goals to other universities in Venezuela and the world. However, it is unique, experimental and independent, innovative in creating professional unit of Basic Courses, departmentalization, the semi-annual periods, the system of credit units, intensive courses, etc.., To develop scientific research, teaching and extension in all aspects of knowledge, which provides educational programs for undergraduate and graduate. It is almost an antithesis of the traditional university campus which is located in the nuclei university located in Anzoátegui, Bolívar, Monagas, Nueva Esparta and Sucre, thus assuming responsibility for education from their home university and a key driver for overall development throughout the island region east and south, depending on conditions and possible development trends in each of the Eastern States where they operate.

Related links 

Oceanographic Institute of Venezuela

References

External links
University of Oriente Website 

Universities in Venezuela
Educational institutions established in 1959
1959 establishments in Venezuela
Buildings and structures in Sucre (state)
Buildings and structures in Anzoátegui
Buildings and structures in Monagas
Buildings and structures in Bolívar (state)
Buildings and structures in Nueva Esparta